The Aquatics events at the 2006 Commonwealth Games were held at the Melbourne Sports and Aquatic Centre (MSAC) and were divided into 3 separate disciplines, with medals awarded in 54 events:
Diving (10)
Swimming (42)
Synchronized swimming (2)

Announcing for the Diving, Swimming and Synchronized swimming was done by local swimmer and radio announcer Alex Cooke.

Overall medal table

Diving

Men's events

Women's events

Medal table

Swimming

Men's events

Legend
WR: World record, (EAD events: World record)
GR: Games record
*: Swam only in the heats

Women's events

Legend
WR: World record, (EAD events: World record)
GR: Games record

Medal table

Synchronised swimming

Women's events

Medal table

References
 
 
 

2006 Commonwealth Games events
2006
Commonwealth Games
International aquatics competitions hosted by Australia